The 1976 Pittsburgh Pirates season was the 90th in the National League, and the 95th in franchise history.  The Pirates compiled a 92–70 record during the season, as they finished in second place in the NL East, nine games behind their cross-state rivals, the Philadelphia Phillies.  As a result, their run of five division titles in a six-year span came to an end.  It was also the final season for Danny Murtaugh as the Pirates' manager.

Offseason 
 December 4, 1975: Rafael Vásquez was signed as an amateur free agent by the Pirates.
 December 11, 1975: Dock Ellis, Ken Brett and Willie Randolph were traded by the Pirates to the New York Yankees for Doc Medich.
 January 27, 1976: Pascual Pérez was signed as an amateur free agent by the Pirates.

Regular season 
 August 9, 1976: John Candelaria pitched a no-hitter against the Los Angeles Dodgers.

Season standings

Record vs. opponents

Game log

|- bgcolor="ccffcc"
| 1 || April 10 || @ Phillies || 5–4 (11) || Demery (1–0) || McGraw || — || 42,147 || 1–0
|- bgcolor="ccffcc"
| 2 || April 11 || @ Phillies || 8–3 || Kison (1–0) || Carlton || Moose (1) || 18,373 || 2–0
|- bgcolor="ccffcc"
| 3 || April 13 || Cardinals || 14–4 || Reuss (1–0) || Falcone || — || 40,937 || 3–0
|- bgcolor="ccffcc"
| 4 || April 15 || Cardinals || 9–3 || Rooker (1–0) || McGlothen || Hernandez (1) || 9,490 || 4–0
|- bgcolor="ccffcc"
| 5 || April 16 || Mets || 3–1 || Medich (1–0) || Lolich || — || 19,899 || 5–0
|- bgcolor="ffbbbb"
| 6 || April 17 || Mets || 1–17 || Koosman || Kison (1–1) || — || 13,082 || 5–1
|- bgcolor="ccffcc"
| 7 || April 18 || Mets || 7–5 || Reuss (2–0) || Swan || Hernandez (2) || 9,106 || 6–1
|- bgcolor="ffbbbb"
| 8 || April 20 || Phillies || 1–5 || Kaat || Candelaria (0–1) || — || 8,800 || 6–2
|- bgcolor="ffbbbb"
| 9 || April 21 || Phillies || 0–3 || Underwood || Medich (1–1) || McGraw || 9,175 || 6–3
|- bgcolor="ffbbbb"
| 10 || April 23 || @ Giants || 3–7 || Montefusco || Reuss (2–1) || Lavelle || 15,621 || 6–4
|- bgcolor="ffbbbb"
| 11 || April 24 || @ Giants || 1–3 || Halicki || Rooker (1–1) || Lavelle || 9,222 || 6–5
|- bgcolor="ccffcc"
| 12 || April 25 || @ Giants || 3–0 || Candelaria (1–1) || Caldwell || — || 23,700 || 7–5
|- bgcolor="ffbbbb"
| 13 || April 26 || @ Dodgers || 1–7 || John || Medich (1–2) || — || 23,374 || 7–6
|- bgcolor="ffbbbb"
| 14 || April 27 || @ Dodgers || 3–5 || Rau || Kison (1–2) || Hough || 21,612 || 7–7
|- bgcolor="ffbbbb"
| 15 || April 28 || @ Dodgers || 1–2 || Hooton || Reuss (2–2) || — || 22,769 || 7–8
|- bgcolor="ccffcc"
| 16 || April 30 || @ Padres || 4–3 || Rooker (2–1) || Spillner || Moose (2) || 17,010 || 8–8
|-

|- bgcolor="ccffcc"
| 17 || May 1 || @ Padres || 10–6 || Candelaria (2–1) || Greif || — || 21,773 || 9–8
|- bgcolor="ffbbbb"
| 18 || May 2 || @ Padres || 2–4 || Jones || Medich (1–3) || — || 21,702 || 9–9
|- bgcolor="ccffcc"
| 19 || May 4 || Giants || 6–5 || Reuss (3–2) || Caldwell || Moose (3) || 4,729 || 10–9
|- bgcolor="ccffcc"
| 20 || May 5 || Giants || 6–1 || Kison (2–2) || Halicki || — || 6,321 || 11–9
|- bgcolor="ccffcc"
| 21 || May 6 || Giants || 3–0 || Rooker (3–1) || Barr || Demery (1) || 5,111 || 12–9
|- bgcolor="ccffcc"
| 22 || May 7 || Braves || 3–1 || Candelaria (3–1) || Messersmith || — || 6,049 || 13–9
|- bgcolor="ccffcc"
| 23 || May 8 || Braves || 5–3 || Medich (2–3) || Niekro || Giusti (1) || 6,864 || 14–9
|- bgcolor="ccffcc"
| 24 || May 9 || Braves || 5–2 || Reuss (4–2) || Ruthven || — || 9,275 || 15–9
|- bgcolor="ffbbbb"
| 25 || May 11 || @ Reds || 0–6 || Nolan || Kison (2–3) || — || 26,850 || 15–10
|- bgcolor="ccffcc"
| 26 || May 12 || @ Reds || 6–3 || Rooker (4–1) || Gullett || — || 26,053 || 16–10
|- bgcolor="ffbbbb"
| 27 || May 14 || Dodgers || 2–3 || Hough || Candelaria (3–2) || Marshall || 13,764 || 16–11
|- bgcolor="ccffcc"
| 28 || May 15 || Dodgers || 4–2 || Medich (3–3) || Rau || Moose (4) || 12,165 || 17–11
|- bgcolor="ffbbbb"
| 29 || May 16 || Dodgers || 0–6 || Hooton || Reuss (4–3) || — || 15,334 || 17–12
|- bgcolor="ccffcc"
| 30 || May 17 || @ Cardinals || 2–1 || Kison (3–3) || Curtis || Moose (5) || 10,538 || 18–12
|- bgcolor="ccffcc"
| 31 || May 18 || @ Cardinals || 4–1 || Rooker (5–1) || Hrabosky || — || 10,288 || 19–12
|- bgcolor="ccffcc"
| 32 || May 19 || @ Cardinals || 7–6 || Hernandez (1–0) || Rasmussen || Moose (6) || 11,229 || 20–12
|- bgcolor="ffbbbb"
| 33 || May 20 || @ Cardinals || 1–4 || Denny || Medich (3–4) || — || 11,315 || 20–13
|- bgcolor="ffbbbb"
| 34 || May 21 || Cubs || 4–5 || Reuschel || Demery (1–1) || Knowles || 9,342 || 20–14
|- bgcolor="ccffcc"
| 35 || May 22 || Cubs || 4–3 (16) || Moose (1–0) || Reuschel || — || 7,081 || 21–14
|- bgcolor="ffbbbb"
| 36 || May 23 || Cubs || 5–6 || Zamora || Tekulve (0–1) || Sutter ||  || 21–15
|- bgcolor="ccffcc"
| 37 || May 23 || Cubs || 9–1 || Reuss (5–3) || Garman || — || 20,477 || 22–15
|- bgcolor="ffbbbb"
| 38 || May 24 || Expos || 2–4 || Fryman || Candelaria (3–3) || Scherman || 5,420 || 22–16
|- bgcolor="ffbbbb"
| 39 || May 25 || Expos || 3–6 (11) || Granger || Moose (1–1) || — || 4,805 || 22–17
|- bgcolor="ccffcc"
| 40 || May 26 || Expos || 6–3 || Demery (2–1) || Warthen || Candelaria (1) || 6,581 || 23–17
|- bgcolor="ffbbbb"
| 41 || May 29 || @ Cubs || 1–4 || Bonham || Kison (3–4) || Zamora || 12,357 || 23–18
|- bgcolor="ccffcc"
| 42 || May 30 || @ Cubs || 4–2 || Rooker (6–1) || Burris || — || 19,410 || 24–18
|- bgcolor="ffbbbb"
| 43 || May 31 || @ Mets || 2–13 || Matlack || Reuss (5–4) || — ||  || 24–19
|- bgcolor="ccffcc"
| 44 || May 31 || @ Mets || 2–1 || Medich (4–4) || Apodaca || — || 46,004 || 25–19
|-

|- bgcolor="ccffcc"
| 45 || June 1 || @ Mets || 3–2 || Candelaria (4–3) || Koosman || — || 13,596 || 26–19
|- bgcolor="ccffcc"
| 46 || June 2 || @ Expos || 4–2 || Kison (4–4) || Fryman || Giusti (2) || 11,337 || 27–19
|- bgcolor="ffbbbb"
| 47 || June 3 || @ Expos || 1–7 || Stanhouse || Rooker (6–2) || — || 7,951 || 27–20
|- bgcolor="ccffcc"
| 48 || June 4 || Padres || 7–2 || Reuss (6–4) || Freisleben || — || 9,249 || 28–20
|- bgcolor="ffbbbb"
| 49 || June 5 || Padres || 9–11 (15) || Freisleben || Hernandez (1–1) || — || 15,558 || 28–21
|- bgcolor="ffbbbb"
| 50 || June 6 || Padres || 1–6 || Strom || Candelaria (4–4) || — || 51,726 || 28–22
|- bgcolor="ccffcc"
| 51 || June 7 || Reds || 5–4 || Moose (2–1) || McEnaney || Giusti (3) || 16,001 || 29–22
|- bgcolor="ffbbbb"
| 52 || June 8 || Reds || 5–10 || Alcala || Rooker (6–3) || McEnaney || 17,331 || 29–23
|- bgcolor="ffbbbb"
| 53 || June 9 || Reds || 1–6 || Nolan || Reuss (6–5) || — || 18,127 || 29–24
|- bgcolor="ffbbbb"
| 54 || June 10 || Reds || 1–6 || Gullett || Medich (4–5) || — || 17,280 || 29–25
|- bgcolor="ccffcc"
| 55 || June 11 || @ Braves || 6–2 || Candelaria (5–4) || Moret || Moose (7) || 13,687 || 30–25
|- bgcolor="ccffcc"
| 56 || June 12 || @ Braves || 4–2 (11) || Moose (3–1) || Devine || Tekulve (1) || 20,117 || 31–25
|- bgcolor="ccffcc"
| 57 || June 13 || @ Braves || 6–5 || Demery (3–1) || Leon || Moose (8) || 15,656 || 32–25
|- bgcolor="ccffcc"
| 58 || June 14 || @ Astros || 2–1 || Reuss (7–5) || Richard || — || 9,884 || 33–25
|- bgcolor="ccffcc"
| 59 || June 16 || @ Astros || 6–3 || Medich (5–5) || Andujar || Demery (2) || 12,249 || 34–25
|- bgcolor="ccffcc"
| 60 || June 18 || Astros || 7–3 || Candelaria (6–4) || Richard || — || 19,141 || 35–25
|- bgcolor="ffbbbb"
| 61 || June 20 || Astros || 4–9 || Griffin || Moose (3–2) || — || 18,670 || 35–26
|- bgcolor="ccffcc"
| 62 || June 22 || @ Cubs || 10–7 || Demery (4–1) || Knowles || Hernandez (3) || 10,116 || 36–26
|- bgcolor="ffbbbb"
| 63 || June 23 || @ Cubs || 5–6 || Zamora || Moose (3–3) || — || 17,661 || 36–27
|- bgcolor="ffbbbb"
| 64 || June 24 || @ Cubs || 1–2 (13) || Zamora || Langford (0–1) || — || 3,824 || 36–28
|- bgcolor="ccffcc"
| 65 || June 25 || @ Expos || 9–2 || Kison (5–4) || Carrithers || — || 6,581 || 37–28
|- bgcolor="ccffcc"
| 66 || June 26 || @ Expos || 7–6 || Demery (5–1) || Murray || — || 10,445 || 38–28
|- bgcolor="ffbbbb"
| 67 || June 27 || @ Expos || 3–4 || Fryman || Medich (5–6) || Murray || 12,824 || 38–29
|- bgcolor="ccffcc"
| 68 || June 28 || Cubs || 9–2 || Rooker (7–3) || Coleman || — || 7,370 || 39–29
|- bgcolor="ccffcc"
| 69 || June 29 || Cubs || 10–1 || Candelaria (7–4) || Renko || — || 8,774 || 40–29
|- bgcolor="ccffcc"
| 70 || June 30 || Cubs || 7–5 || Kison (6–4) || Bonham || Moose (9) || 10,681 || 41–29
|-

|- bgcolor="ccffcc"
| 71 || July 2 || Phillies || 10–9 (10) || Hernandez (2–1) || Garber || — || 39,328 || 42–29
|- bgcolor="ffbbbb"
| 72 || July 3 || Phillies || 2–3 || McGraw || Moose (3–4) || — || 19,327 || 42–30
|- bgcolor="ffbbbb"
| 73 || July 4 || Phillies || 5–10 || Carlton || Demery (5–2) || Reed ||  || 42–31
|- bgcolor="ccffcc"
| 74 || July 4 || Phillies || 7–1 || Kison (7–4) || Kaat || — || 32,422 || 43–31
|- bgcolor="ffbbbb"
| 75 || July 5 || @ Braves || 6–8 || Dal Canton || Hernandez (2–2) || Marshall || 48,467 || 43–32
|- bgcolor="ffbbbb"
| 76 || July 6 || @ Braves || 2–4 || Messersmith || Rooker (7–4) || Marshall || 12,448 || 43–33
|- bgcolor="ccffcc"
| 77 || July 7 || @ Braves || 9–7 || Reuss (8–5) || Ruthven || Moose (10) || 11,480 || 44–33
|- bgcolor="ffbbbb"
| 78 || July 9 || @ Reds || 11–12 (10) || Eastwick || Demery (5–3) || — ||  || 44–34
|- bgcolor="ffbbbb"
| 79 || July 9 || @ Reds || 1–2 || Norman || Medich (5–7) || — || 53,328 || 44–35
|- bgcolor="ccffcc"
| 80 || July 10 || @ Reds || 7–1 || Candelaria (8–4) || Billingham || — || 50,756 || 45–35
|- bgcolor="ccffcc"
| 81 || July 11 || @ Reds || 8–5 || Tekulve (1–1) || Borbon || Reuss (1) || 47,153 || 46–35
|- bgcolor="ccffcc"
| 82 || July 15 || Braves || 13–1 || Candelaria (9–4) || Niekro || — || 10,488 || 47–35
|- bgcolor="ccffcc"
| 83 || July 16 || Braves || 7–2 || Reuss (9–5) || Messersmith || — || 11,151 || 48–35
|- bgcolor="ffbbbb"
| 84 || July 17 || Braves || 2–10 || Ruthven || Kison (7–5) || — || 14,776 || 48–36
|- bgcolor="ffbbbb"
| 85 || July 18 || Reds || 8–9 || Billingham || Medich (5–8) || Eastwick || 33,697 || 48–37
|- bgcolor="ffbbbb"
| 86 || July 19 || Reds || 2–4 || Zachry || Rooker (7–5) || — || 26,585 || 48–38
|- bgcolor="ccffcc"
| 87 || July 20 || Astros || 9–5 || Candelaria (10–4) || Griffin || Tekulve (2) ||  || 49–38
|- bgcolor="ffbbbb"
| 88 || July 20 || Astros || 3–4 || Forsch || Giusti (0–1) || — || 11,922 || 49–39
|- bgcolor="ccffcc"
| 89 || July 21 || Astros || 5–1 || Reuss (10–5) || Dierker || — ||  || 50–39
|- bgcolor="ccffcc"
| 90 || July 21 || Astros || 4–1 || Demery (6–3) || Andujar || Giusti (4) || 12,209 || 51–39
|- bgcolor="ffbbbb"
| 91 || July 22 || @ Phillies || 0–3 || Underwood || Kison (7–6) || Reed || 43,050 || 51–40
|- bgcolor="ffbbbb"
| 92 || July 23 || @ Phillies || 1–11 || Lonborg || Medich (5–9) || — || 40,120 || 51–41
|- bgcolor="ccffcc"
| 93 || July 24 || @ Phillies || 8–5 || Rooker (8–5) || Christenson || Giusti (5) ||  || 52–41
|- bgcolor="ffbbbb"
| 94 || July 24 || @ Phillies || 1–7 || Carlton || Moose (3–5) || — || 57,723 || 52–42
|- bgcolor="ffbbbb"
| 95 || July 25 || @ Phillies || 7–13 || Reed || Giusti (0–2) || — || 37,692 || 52–43
|- bgcolor="ccffcc"
| 96 || July 27 || @ Cardinals || 3–1 || Kison (8–6) || Falcone || — || 13,953 || 53–43
|- bgcolor="ccffcc"
| 97 || July 28 || @ Mets || 1–0 (13) || Giusti (1–2) || Sanders || — || 22,215 || 54–43
|- bgcolor="ccffcc"
| 98 || July 29 || @ Mets || 2–1 (10) || Tekulve (2–1) || Lockwood || — || 12,588 || 55–43
|- bgcolor="ccffcc"
| 99 || July 30 || Expos || 4–3 (13) || Tekulve (3–1) || Kerrigan || — || 12,774 || 56–43
|- bgcolor="ffbbbb"
| 100 || July 31 || Expos || 6–7 || Murray || Moose (3–6) || — || 10,981 || 56–44
|-

|- bgcolor="ffbbbb"
| 101 || August 1 || Expos || 0–2 || Rogers || Kison (8–7) || — || 17,150 || 56–45
|- bgcolor="ffbbbb"
| 102 || August 2 || Cardinals || 0–4 || Falcone || Medich (5–10) || — || 7,553 || 56–46
|- bgcolor="ccffcc"
| 103 || August 3 || Cardinals || 2–1 || Rooker (9–5) || Greif || — ||  || 57–46
|- bgcolor="ffbbbb"
| 104 || August 3 || Cardinals || 2–4 || Hrabosky || Giusti (1–3) || Wallace || 14,781 || 57–47
|- bgcolor="ccffcc"
| 105 || August 4 || Cardinals || 2–1 (12) || Giusti (2–3) || Wallace || — || 8,426 || 58–47
|- bgcolor="ffbbbb"
| 106 || August 5 || Mets || 4–7 || Matlack || Reuss (10–6) || Lockwood || 7,836 || 58–48
|- bgcolor="ccffcc"
| 107 || August 7 || Mets || 12–3 || Kison (9–7) || Seaver || — ||  || 59–48
|- bgcolor="ffbbbb"
| 108 || August 7 || Mets || 2–4 || Espinosa || Medich (5–11) || Lockwood || 12,364 || 59–49
|- bgcolor="ffbbbb"
| 109 || August 8 || Mets || 4–7 || Lolich || Rooker (9–6) || — || 16,538 || 59–50
|- bgcolor="ccffcc"
| 110 || August 9 || Dodgers || 2–0 || Candelaria (11–4) || Rau || — || 9,860 || 60–50
|- bgcolor="ffbbbb"
| 111 || August 10 || Dodgers || 1–5 || Sutton || Reuss (10–7) || — || 13,670 || 60–51
|- bgcolor="ffbbbb"
| 112 || August 11 || Dodgers || 0–2 || Rhoden || Demery (6–4) || — || 16,222 || 60–52
|- bgcolor="ccffcc"
| 113 || August 13 || @ Astros || 8–5 || Tekulve (4–1) || Niekro || — || 17,876 || 61–52
|- bgcolor="ccffcc"
| 114 || August 14 || @ Astros || 5–4 || Giusti (3–3) || Pentz || — || 9,721 || 62–52
|- bgcolor="ccffcc"
| 115 || August 15 || @ Astros || 8–6 || Medich (6–11) || Larson || Tekulve (3) ||  || 63–52
|- bgcolor="ccffcc"
| 116 || August 15 || @ Astros || 3–0 || Reuss (11–7) || Sambito || — || 16,326 || 64–52
|- bgcolor="ffbbbb"
| 117 || August 17 || @ Giants || 6–7 || Lavelle || Moose (3–7) || Williams || 9,215 || 64–53
|- bgcolor="ccffcc"
| 118 || August 18 || @ Giants || 12–1 (7) || Rooker (10–6) || Montefusco || — || 3,817 || 65–53
|- bgcolor="ccffcc"
| 119 || August 19 || @ Giants || 1–0 || Candelaria (12–4) || Barr || — || 2,709 || 66–53
|- bgcolor="ffbbbb"
| 120 || August 20 || @ Dodgers || 1–8 || Rau || Kison (9–8) || Hough || 25,107 || 66–54
|- bgcolor="ffbbbb"
| 121 || August 21 || @ Dodgers || 1–5 || Sutton || Moose (3–8) || — || 42,235 || 66–55
|- bgcolor="ccffcc"
| 122 || August 22 || @ Dodgers || 6–1 || Demery (7–4) || Rhoden || Tekulve (4) || 24,295 || 67–55
|- bgcolor="ffbbbb"
| 123 || August 23 || @ Padres || 4–5 || Johnson || Rooker (10–7) || Metzger || 18,396 || 67–56
|- bgcolor="ffbbbb"
| 124 || August 24 || @ Padres || 3–7 || Strom || Candelaria (12–5) || — || 11,002 || 67–57
|- bgcolor="ccffcc"
| 125 || August 25 || @ Padres || 3–0 || Kison (10–8) || Freisleben || — || 10,963 || 68–57
|- bgcolor="ccffcc"
| 126 || August 27 || Giants || 5–2 || Demery (8–4) || Montefusco || — || 12,580 || 69–57
|- bgcolor="ccffcc"
| 127 || August 28 || Giants || 7–1 || Rooker (11–7) || D'Acquisto || — || 11,043 || 70–57
|- bgcolor="ccffcc"
| 128 || August 29 || Giants || 3–2 (11) || Candelaria (13–5) || Moffitt || — || 12,972 || 71–57
|- bgcolor="ccffcc"
| 129 || August 31 || Padres || 3–0 || Reuss (12–7) || Jones || — || 9,674 || 72–57
|-

|- bgcolor="ccffcc"
| 130 || September 1 || Padres || 4–1 || Kison (11–8) || Strom || Tekulve (5) || 5,381 || 73–57
|- bgcolor="ccffcc"
| 131 || September 2 || Padres || 5–0 || Demery (9–4) || Freisleben || — || 5,545 || 74–57
|- bgcolor="ccffcc"
| 132 || September 3 || @ Expos || 9–7 || Rooker (12–7) || Stanhouse || Tekulve (6) ||  || 75–57
|- bgcolor="ccffcc"
| 133 || September 3 || @ Expos || 7–2 || Candelaria (14–5) || Carrithers || — || 6,342 || 76–57
|- bgcolor="ccffcc"
| 134 || September 4 || @ Expos || 5–3 || Giusti (4–3) || Murray || Tekulve (7) || 3,290 || 77–57
|- bgcolor="ffbbbb"
| 135 || September 5 || @ Expos || 0–1 || Fryman || Reuss (12–8) || — || 6,180 || 77–58
|- bgcolor="ccffcc"
| 136 || September 6 || Phillies || 6–2 || Kison (12–8) || Kaat || — ||  || 78–58
|- bgcolor="ccffcc"
| 137 || September 6 || Phillies || 5–1 || Demery (10–4) || Underwood || — || 41,703 || 79–58
|- bgcolor="ccffcc"
| 138 || September 8 || Phillies || 6–1 || Rooker (13–7) || Carlton || — || 30,976 || 80–58
|- bgcolor="ffbbbb"
| 139 || September 10 || Expos || 2–4 || Fryman || Candelaria (14–6) || — || 12,032 || 80–59
|- bgcolor="ccffcc"
| 140 || September 11 || Expos || 4–3 || Reuss (13–8) || Rogers || Tekulve (8) || 7,509 || 81–59
|- bgcolor="ccffcc"
| 141 || September 12 || Expos || 6–1 || Kison (13–8) || Stanhouse || Tekulve (9) || 12,765 || 82–59
|- bgcolor="ffbbbb"
| 142 || September 13 || Mets || 0–5 || Seaver || Demery (10–5) || — || 7,892 || 82–60
|- bgcolor="ffbbbb"
| 143 || September 14 || Mets || 3–4 || Lockwood || Rooker (13–8) || — || 7,867 || 82–61
|- bgcolor="ccffcc"
| 144 || September 15 || @ Phillies || 7–2 || Candelaria (15–6) || Kaat || — || 45,010 || 83–61
|- bgcolor="ccffcc"
| 145 || September 16 || @ Phillies || 7–6 || Tekulve (5–1) || Reed || — || 35,806 || 84–61
|- bgcolor="ccffcc"
| 146 || September 17 || @ Mets || 4–1 || Medich (7–11) || Matlack || Giusti (6) || 14,304 || 85–61
|- bgcolor="ffbbbb"
| 147 || September 18 || @ Mets || 2–6 || Seaver || Demery (10–6) || — || 15,879 || 85–62
|- bgcolor="ffbbbb"
| 148 || September 19 || @ Mets || 6–7 || Espinosa || Giusti (4–4) || Lockwood || 18,652 || 85–63
|- bgcolor="ffbbbb"
| 149 || September 20 || @ Mets || 4–5 || Apodaca || Tekulve (5–2) || — || 5,922 || 85–64
|- bgcolor="ccffcc"
| 150 || September 21 || @ Cubs || 4–3 || Kison (14–8) || Renko || Rooker (1) ||  || 86–64
|- bgcolor="ffbbbb"
| 151 || September 21 || @ Cubs || 1–2 (13) || Reuschel || Moose (3–9) || — || 5,017 || 86–65
|- bgcolor="ffbbbb"
| 152 || September 22 || @ Cubs || 3–4 || Coleman || Tekulve (5–3) || — || 3,375 || 86–66
|- bgcolor="ccffcc"
| 153 || September 23 || @ Cubs || 5–4 (10) || Giusti (5–4) || Knowles || Kison (1) || 2,132 || 87–66
|- bgcolor="ffbbbb"
| 154 || September 24 || @ Cardinals || 6–10 || Forsch || Candelaria (15–7) || — ||  || 87–67
|- bgcolor="ccffcc"
| 155 || September 24 || @ Cardinals || 11–1 || Rooker (14–8) || Curtis || — || 10,368 || 88–67
|- bgcolor="ffbbbb"
| 156 || September 25 || @ Cardinals || 0–3 || McGlothen || Reuss (13–9) || — || 7,858 || 88–68
|- bgcolor="ffbbbb"
| 157 || September 26 || @ Cardinals || 2–5 || Denny || Kison (14–9) || Hrabosky || 10,456 || 88–69
|- bgcolor="ccffcc"
| 158 || September 28 || Cubs || 5–1 || Medich (8–11) || Reuschel || Reuss (2) || 2,880 || 89–69
|- bgcolor="ffbbbb"
| 159 || September 29 || Cubs || 0–1 || Renko || Demery (10–7) || — || 2,880 || 89–70
|-

|- bgcolor="ccffcc"
| 160 || October 2 || Cardinals || 8–0 || Candelaria (16–7) || McGlothen || — || 4,250 || 90–70
|- bgcolor="ccffcc"
| 161 || October 3 || Cardinals || 1–0 || Rooker (15–8) || Denny || — ||  || 91–70
|- bgcolor="ccffcc"
| 162 || October 3 || Cardinals || 1–0 || Reuss (14–9) || Falcone || — || 24,228 || 92–70
|-

|-
| Legend:       = Win       = LossBold = Pirates team member

Opening Day lineup

Notable transactions 
 June 8, 1976: Bob Long was drafted by the Pirates in the 24th round of the 1976 Major League Baseball draft.
 July 2, 1976: Albert Williams was released by the Pirates.
 September 8, 1976: Ramón Hernández was purchased from the Pirates by the Chicago Cubs.

Roster

Player stats

Batting

Starters by position 
Note: Pos = Position; G = Games played; AB = At bats; R = Runs scored; H = Hits; Avg. = Batting average; HR = Home runs; RBI = Runs batted in; SB = Stolen bases

Other batters 
Note: G = Games played; AB = At bats; R = Runs scored; H = Hits; Avg.= Batting average; HR = Home runs; RBI = Runs batted in;  SB = Stolen bases

Pitching

Starting pitchers 
Note: G = Games pitched; IP = Innings pitched; W = Wins; L = Losses; ERA = Earned run average; SO = Strikeouts

Other pitchers 
Note: G = Games pitched; IP = Innings pitched; W = Wins; L = Losses; ERA = Earned run average; SO = Strikeouts

Relief pitchers 
Note: G = Games pitched; W = Wins; L = Losses; SV = Saves; ERA = Earned run average; SO = Strikeouts

Awards and honors 

1976 Major League Baseball All-Star Game

Farm system

Notes

References 
 1976 Pittsburgh Pirates at Baseball Reference
 1976 Pittsburgh Pirates at Baseball Almanac

Pittsburgh Pirates seasons
Pittsburgh Pirates season
Pittsburg